Dong Yu (Chinese: 董宇; born 15 July 1994 in Qingdao) is a Chinese footballer who plays as a right-back for Zhejiang Pro in the Chinese Super League.

Club career
In 2014 Dong Yu started his professional footballer career with Chinese Super League side Hangzhou Greentown in 2014, where he initially started his youth career as a forward. He made his league debut for Hangzhou on 6 April 2014 in a league game against Guizhou Renhe that ended in a 2-1 victory. Dong would struggle to gain much playing time as a forward and was unfortunately part of the squad that was relegated at the end of the 2016 Chinese Super League season. He would remain with the club and go on to be converted to a right-back before establishing himself as a regular member within the team as they renamed themselves Zhejiang Professional. He would then play a vital part as the club gained promotion to the top tier at the end of the 2021 campaign.

Career statistics
Statistics accurate as of match played 31 January 2023.

References

External links
 

1994 births
Living people
Footballers from Qingdao
Zhejiang Professional F.C. players
Chinese Super League players
China League One players
Association football forwards
Chinese footballers